The 1896-97 English football season was Aston Villa's 9th season in the Football League since being one of its 12 founding members in 1888.

The season got off to a slow start, with Villa recording only two wins in the first six games. An unbeaten run of 12 games took them to the top, where they finished with a lead of 11 points. The title was won when Derby County F.C. failed to win on 10 April; Villa had three games left to play, all of which were won. 

For good measure, the FA Cup was also won, to make Villa the second team to complete "The Double".

This was the season during which Villa moved from Wellington Road to their current home at Villa Park, although it was still referred to as 'Aston Lower Grounds' for some time.

John Campbell was not quite as productive as in the previous season, and the leading scorer honours went to Fred Wheldon. Fred had been signed in 1896 for £350 from local rivals Small Heath, who had been  relegated the previous season. He was a good dribbler with the ball and won four caps for England. He played first class cricket for Worcestershire.

Results

Football League

A total of 16 teams competed in the First Division in the 1896–97 season. Each team would play every other team twice, once at their stadium, and once at the opposition's. Two points were awarded to teams for each win, one point per draw, and none for defeats.

Final league position

FA Cup

Trivia
Ever-present: Charlie Athersmith, Jimmy
Cowan, Fred Wheldon

First at top: 28 Nov 

Players used: 17

See also 
1897 FA Cup Final

References

External links
AVFC History 1896–97 season

Aston Villa F.C. seasons
1897